Ghostlights is the seventh full-length album by Tobias Sammet's German metal opera project Avantasia. It was released on 29 January 2016. The opening track and first single "Mystery of a Blood Red Rose" was a candidate for the German representative at the Eurovision Song Contest 2016, along with nine other songs. The Digibook edition of the album included a bonus track and a bonus CD entitled Avantasia Live, which featured songs recorded mainly during Avantasia's 2014 performance at Wacken Open Air Festival.

Ghostlights scored the highest positions of any Avantasia release in several international music charts and marks the second time Avantasia has entered the US Billboard 200 albums chart.

The plot of the album concludes the story started on The Mystery of Time. Musically, it shows a darker and more theatrical tone than its predecessor, which Sammet claims to have been spontaneous, not planned.

Background and concept 
In 2014, Tobias Sammet stated that The Mystery of Time hinted at a sequel and the details to that sequel were announced in November 2015.

Unlike The Wicked Trilogy, which spawned three different albums, Ghostlights concludes the plot started on the previous album. The story follows the protagonist as he continues his journey with a group of scientists willing to find a way to align everybody's personality so they can understand each other and make the world a better place. Soon, the protagonist realizes aligning people is also a way of having control over them. Each song of the album represents a different station of the protagonist's journey. As Sammet explains, "It's a journey where he is looking for answers for some questions about his own existence and that leaves its mark on his philosophical worldview as well. Those twelve songs represent key moments on this journey and then it's done." He left an open ending "so that people can think about the things that happen in the story. You should be able to interpret it for yourself in the end."

Regarding the album's title, Sammet commented:

Song information 
The opening track and single "Mystery of a Blood Red Rose" was intended to have Meat Loaf as a lead singer, and his management was initially positive about having him perform on the album, but for unknown reasons they ultimately declined.

Describing the second and longest track "Let the Storm Descend Upon You", one of the last to be written for the album, Sammet commented:

After "The Haunting" had been written, Sammet was thinking of who could be the guest singer for it, and it had to be someone "who would be both theatrical actor, but at the same time dramatic vocalist and the song was very very eery [sic]. And I imagined somebody who should sound like a crossing between something very flamboyant and the Child Catcher in Chitty Chitty Bang Bang". He thought of Dee Snider after exploring his record collection, though he considered him a non-obvious choice due to the song being very different from "We're Not Gonna Take It" and "I Wanna Rock".

Sammet describes the early version of "Seduction of Decay" as "an epic heavy metal version of 'Black Dog'" meant for a singer like the young Robert Plant. The song also reminded him of Rage for Order-era Queensrÿche, so he decided to invite Geoff Tate, who accepted.

Sammet compares the track "Draconian Love" to The Metal Opera's "Avantasia" and The Wicked Symphony's "Dying for an Angel". Herbie Langhans, who guest performs as co-lead singer, sung his parts an octave lower than Sammet at Sascha Paeth's suggestion, so that their voices sound more different from each other. Sammet acknowledges that the result has been labeled "gothic" by some.

Critical reception

The reviewer for the Myglobalmind Online Magazine wrote that Ghostlights was heavier, more mysterious and darker than the previous album The Mystery of Time. He also lauded the sound production and arrangements by Sasha Paeth which underlined singer Tobias Sammet's vocals. A review by the AntiHero Magazine found that the album was one of Avantasia's "strongest releases to date" and that it featured the darkest atmosphere Sammet had created so far. The German edition of Metal Hammer lauded the homogenous songwriting and wrote that Ghostlights came partially close to Avantasia's early releases like The Metal Opera Part I and II as well as early Edguy albums. The Sonic Seducer's reviewer wrote that the album had "no musical limits" and that all guest singers harmonized well with Sammet's vocals.

Track listing

 Sammet sings the part of "Aaron" throughout.

The Digibook edition bonus disc – Avantasia Live

 Tracks 1-9 recorded at Wacken Open Air 2014, track 10 recorded at Masters Of Rock 2013, track 11 recorded at Wacken Open Air 2008.
 The Deluxe Edition Book of the album includes the two CDs of the Digibook edition, a third CD with instrumental versions of all the tracks (except the bonus one) and a 68-page photo book.

Personnel

Adapted from the album credits.
 Tobias Sammet - lead vocals on all tracks, additional keyboards and bass
 Sascha Paeth - lead guitar (on tracks 1, 3-4, 6-8, 13), rhythm guitar, bass, additional keyboards, engineering and mixing
 Michael Rodenberg - orchestration, keyboards, mastering
 Felix Bohnke - drums
 Cloudy Yang - backing vocals

Guest instrumentalists
 Bruce Kulick (Grand Funk Railroad, formerly of Kiss) – lead guitar on tracks 9-10, 12
 Oliver Hartmann (formerly of At Vance) – lead guitar on tracks 2, 5, 9, 11

Guest vocalists
 Jørn Lande (formerly of Masterplan, formerly of Ark)
 Michael Kiske (Unisonic, ex-Helloween)
 Dee Snider (Twisted Sister)
 Geoff Tate (Operation: Mindcrime, formerly of Queensrÿche)
 Marko Hietala (Nightwish, Tarot)
 Sharon den Adel (Within Temptation)
 Bob Catley (Magnum)
 Ronnie Atkins (Pretty Maids)
 Robert Mason (Warrant, formerly of Lynch Mob)
 Herbie Langhans (Sinbreed, Beyond the Bridge, formerly of Seventh Avenue)

Charts

Weekly charts

Year-end charts

References

2016 albums
Avantasia albums
Nuclear Blast albums
Rock operas
Concept albums